Sir Richard Grosvenor, 4th Baronet (26 June 1689 – 12 July 1732) was an English politician who sat in the House of Commons from 1715 to 1732. He was the brother of Sir Robert Grosvenor, 6th Baronet, an ancestor of the modern day Dukes of Westminster.

Early life
Richard Grosvenor was the eldest surviving son of Sir Thomas Grosvenor, 3rd Baronet.  His two older brothers, Thomas and Roger, pre-deceased their father.  At the time of his father's death in 1700, he was still being educated at Eton College, and was under the guardianship of Sir Richard Myddelton, 3rd Baronet, and Thomas and Francis Cholmondeley.  After leaving Eton, he went on the Grand Tour, visiting Switzerland, Bavaria, Italy and the Netherlands.  In 1707, he returned to the family home at Eaton Hall, Cheshire.

Political career
At the 1715 general election, Grosvenor was returned as Member of Parliament for Chester. Also in 1715, he was  mayor of the city. In September 1715 he attended a meeting of the Jacobite Cheshire Club, when it decided not to take part in the rebellion. He was elected MP for Chester again in 1722. In 1727 he participated in the coronation of George II.  At the 1727 general election, Grosvenor and his brother Thomas, won both of the parliamentary seats for Chester.  During the time that Grosvenor was baronet, the estates in London were being developed. Also during this time there is evidence of the first association of the Grosvenor family with horse racing, when Grosvenor's horses ran at Chester and Newmarket in 1720.

Family
Grosvenor died in July 1732 and was buried at Eccleston, Cheshire. In 1708, he had married Jane, the daughter of Sir Edward Wyndham of Orchard Wyndham, Somerset.  The couple had one daughter, Catherine, who died in 1718.  During the following year, Jane Grosvenor died and Grosvenor then married Diana, the only daughter of Sir George Warburton, 3rd Baronet Arley.  Again, they had no children.

Grosvenor was therefore succeeded by his younger brother, Thomas, who in turn died later the same year.

References 

1689 births
1732 deaths
Burials in Cheshire
People educated at Eton College
Baronets in the Baronetage of England
Members of the Parliament of Great Britain for English constituencies
British MPs 1715–1722
British MPs 1722–1727
British MPs 1727–1734
Richard Grosvenor, 4th Baronet
Mayors of Chester